Ottawa/Carp Airport or Carp Airport  is located  south of Carp, Ontario, Canada, a small village that is now part of Ottawa. Carp is the only airport in the Ottawa area where private hangar space is readily available, so it is a popular home base for local general aviation pilots.

The airport had been owned by the city of Ottawa until 2005 but was transferred to a private company, West Capital Developments, who plan to build an airport community and industrial park at the airport.

History
RCAF Detachment Carp was constructed as a relief landing field for No.2 Service Flying Training School at RCAF Station Uplands, as part of the British Commonwealth Air Training Plan during World War II. The outline of the characteristic three-runway triangle is still visible in the shape of the taxiways, but one of the runways has disappeared, and another (04/22) is gravel-covered and restricted to visual flight rules (VFR) only. Near the airport is CFS Carp, the largest of the Canadian Cold War Emergency Government Headquarters (nicknamed the Diefenbunker), a giant long-term fallout shelter for government and military officials that now serves as a museum.

Tenants

Former

Besides the RCAF, Carp was home to First Air (formerly Bradley Air Services), which at one time had its turboprop maintenance facility and head office at this airport.

Current
Carp is the home of Helicopter Transport Services and Experimental Aircraft Association (EAA) Chapter 245.

Accidents and incidents
On 28 January 1974, Douglas C-47B CF-TVK of Bradley Air Services, now First Air, was destroyed in a hangar fire.
On 16 June 2006, BD-5J jet C-GBDV piloted by Scott Manning, crashed during a Friday practice session for the 2006 Carp Airshow after an incorrectly installed right flap deployed during a low pass, leading to an uncontrollable right roll and crash just beyond the end of runway 10. The pilot was killed.
On 10 February 2021, a Blackshape BS100 performing circuits crashed at the airport, killing the pilot.

See also
 List of airports in the Ottawa area.

References

External links

 West Capital Developments website
 Carp Airport website

Certified airports in Ontario
Transport in Ottawa
Airports of the British Commonwealth Air Training Plan